The United Nations Special Envoy for HIV/AIDS in Africa (abbreviated as UNAIDS) is a diplomatic position that deals with the deadly disease on the continent where the issue is most pressing. It conducts the world's most extensive data collection on HIV epidemiology and is the only cosponsored Joint Program in the United Nations system.

Special envoys
 2001-2006: Stephen Lewis
 2007 on: Elizabeth Mataka
 2012: John Edward Greene was appointed by the United Nations Secretary-General as the Special Envoy for AIDS in the Caribbean
 2012: Michel Kazatchkine was appointed by the United Nations Secretary-General as the Special Envoy on HIV/AIDS for Eastern Europe and Central Asia

External links
 SECRETARY-GENERAL APPOINTS ELIZABETH MATAKA OF BOTSWANA AS SPECIAL ENVOY FOR AIDS IN AFRICA, RENEWS APPOINTMENTS OF THREE OTHERS, United Nations, 21 May 2007

HIV/AIDS activists
HIV/AIDS in Africa
United Nations posts